The , also known as the Great Council of State, was (i) (Daijō-kan) the highest organ of Japan's premodern Imperial government under the Ritsuryō legal system during and after the Nara period or (ii) (Dajō-kan) the highest organ of Japan's government briefly restored to power after the Meiji Restoration, which was replaced by the Cabinet.

It was consolidated in the Taihō Code of 702. The Asuka Kiyomihara Code of 689 marks the initial appearance of this central administrative body composed of the three ministers—the Daijō-daijin (Chancellor), the Sadaijin (Minister of the Left) and the Udaijin (Minister of the Right).

The Imperial governing structure was headed by the Daijō-kan.  This council and its subsidiary ministries handled all secular administrative affairs of the country, while the Jingi-kan or Department of Worship, oversaw all matters regarding Shintō ritual, clergy, and shrines.

This structured organization gradually lost power over the course of the 10th and 11th centuries, as the Fujiwara clan, dominating the post of Imperial regent, began to dominate the Daijō-kan as well. It became increasingly common for the regent to hold the post of chancellor or other office simultaneously. By the 12th century, the council was essentially powerless as a separate entity, though it seems clear that the system was never formally dismantled. Over the course of centuries, the ritsuryō state produced more and more information which was carefully archived; however, with the passage of time in the Heian period, ritsuryō institutions evolved into a political and cultural system without feedback.

By the time of the Emperor Kōmei, the kuge aristocracy were joined in common goals by a number of newly powerful provincial figures from outside Kyoto.  Together, this tenuous, undefined coalition of men worked together to restore the long latent prestige, persuasive power, and active strengths of a re-invigorated Imperial center.  This combination of factors thrust an archaic hierarchy into the center of national attention, but with so many other high-priority matters demanding immediate attention, there was little time or energy to invest in reforming or re-organizing the Daijō-kan.

Ritsuryō organization and hierarchy
The eighth century ritsuryō innovations would prove to be remarkably durable and resilient across the span of centuries.

Any exercise of meaningful powers of court officials reached its nadir during the years of the Tokugawa shogunate, and yet the Daijō-kan did manage to persist intact through the initial years of the Meiji Restoration.  It is not possible to assess or evaluate any individual office without assessing its role in the context of a durable yet flexible network and hierarchy of functionaries.

In the early Meiji period, the appointed Imperial Daijo-kan was filled with princes, aristocrats, loyalists domain lords (daimyō), and samurai.

Within months after Emperor Meiji's Charter Oath, the ancient ritsuryō structure was slightly modified with an express focus on the separation of legislative, administrative, and judicial functions within the Daijō-kan system.  The evolution of a deliberative body within a modern constitutional system was gradual, and its constituent differences from the old Daijō-kan were not entirely self-evident at first, as revealed in an Imperial message in 1869:
"The Assembly shall be for the wide ranging consultation of public opinion and, respecting the Imperial will which laid the foundations of national government, it will be a place where the energies of the multitude are harnessed.  Thus, it is necessary that proceedings will show respect for the Imperial rescript, be united in purpose with the Daijō-kan, take the fundamentals of government to heart, judiciously address matters which arise, and act to ensure that unity within the country is not compromised."

Some months later, another major reform of the Daijō-kan re-united the legislative and executive functions which had been clearly separated earlier.

In 1871, The office of Daijō-daijin in the Great Council of State was briefly resurrected under the Meiji Constitution with the appointment of Sanjō Sanetomi. Despite the similarity of names for its constituent offices, this Daijō-kan would have been unrecognizable to Fujiwara courtiers of the Heian period. Nor would it have seemed at all familiar to those men who surrounded the emperor in the days of the Kenmu Restoration. In due course, it was decided that a modern integrated cabinet system would better serve a modern Japan. The Daijō-kan system, which had been divided into ministerial committees, would be replaced by a more modern model.

In December 1885, the old system was abolished completely;  and yet, even afterwards, some elements of old system were adapted to new uses.  For example, in that year, the title of Naidaijin was reconfigured to mean the Lord Keeper of the Privy Seal of Japan in the Imperial Court.  The man who had previously held the office of prime minister or chief minister of the initial restoration government was the Daijō-daijin, Sanjō Sanetomi.  Sanjō petitioned the emperor to be relieved of his ancient ritsuryō office; and he was then immediately appointed Naidaijin, or Lord Keeper of the Privy Seal.  The office of the Privy Seal was identical with the old Naidaijin only in its Japanese title—not in terms of function or powers.

Council of State
This dry catalog  does provide a superficial glimpse inside the complexity of what was initially designed as a pre-feudal court structure.  What this list cannot easily explain is how or why the Daijō-kan turned out to be both flexible and useful across a span of centuries:
  See also, . 
 .
 .
 .
 , three positions.  There are commonly three Dainagon, sometimes more.
 , three positions.  There are commonly three Chunagon, sometimes more.
 , three positions.  There are commonly three Shōnagon.
 .  This office functions as a manager of daijō-kan activities within the palace.
 .  These are specifically named men who act at the sole discretion of the emperor.
 .  This administrator was charged or tasked with supervising four ministries: Center, Civil Services, Ceremonies, and Popular Affairs.
   This administrator was charged or tasked with supervising four ministries: Military, Justice, Treasury and Imperial Household.
 .
 .
 .
 .
 .
 .
 , 20 positions. There are twenty officials with this title.

Ritsuryō Eight Ministries
The Asuka-, Nara- and Heian-period Imperial court hierarchy encompassed a multi-faceted bureaucracy focused on serving the needs of the Emperor, the Imperial family, the Imperial household and the Imperial state.

Imperial power and prestige would wax and wane during the subsequent Kamakura-, Kenmu-, Muromachi-, Nanboku-chō-, Sengoku-, Azuchi–Momoyama-, and Edo-periods; nevertheless, the basic structure of the Imperial household remained largely unchanged.  A mere list of the court titles cannot reveal nearly enough about the actual functioning of the Daijō-kan; but the hierarchical relationships sketch a general context.

Ministry of the Center

This ministry became the governmental agency for matters most closely pertaining to the emperor.

This official had the responsibility to oversee the inspection of the interior apartments of the palace; and he was granted the privilege of retaining his swords in the presence of the emperor.

There are 8 officials with this title, all equal in rank and in the confidence of the Emperor. In the Meiji period, a variant equerry was introduced as part of the Imperial retinue. As explained in an excerpt from the : " will perform attendant duties and will relay to him military matters and orders, be present at military reviews [in his name] and accompanying him to formal ceremonies and interviews."

Ministry of Civil Services

This ministry collected and maintained  biographical archives of meritorious subjects.

This office is ordinarily filled by a son or close relative of the emperor. Two of the offices which were deemed to fit in this "civil services" context were the Imperial court's . and the Emperor's .

Ministry of Ceremonies

Ministry of Popular Affairs

This ministry  is concerned with the general populace, with  police activities, and with land survey records. Registries for all towns and villages are maintained, including census records as well as birth and death records.

Ministry of War

Ministry of Justice

Ministry of the Treasury

This official supervises the receipt of tributes from the provinces and imposes tribute on others.

Ministry of the Imperial Household

The origins of the current  can be traced back to structures which were put into effect during the reign of Emperor Monmu, with some subsequent modifications.

In 1702, the Taika era name for the palace organization, kunai-kan or "government" of the palace, was changed to the kunai-shō or "ministry" of the palace. Accompanying this modification, the chief administrative official was afterwards called kunai-kyō. After the Meiji Restoration, the kunai-shō name remained unchanged. There were two other periods of modification and in 1889.

In the 18th century, the top ritsuryō officials within this hierarchic structure were:
 , the surveyor of all works which are executed within the interior of the palace.
 .
 , two persons.
 , two persons.
 , two persons.

The deliberate redundancies at the top were common features of each position in this stable hierarchic schema. Many positions typically mirrored the -kyō, -taifu, -shō, -jō, and -sakan pattern.

Tokugawa courtiers
Even nominal administrative powers of court officials reached a nadir during the years of the Tokugawa shogunate. In this impoverished period, titles and court rank were still prized by those outside the traditional kuge.  The Tokugawa shōguns did not demur when the Emperor offered rank and an office in the court:
 Tokugawa Ieyasu had the rank of Jūichii  (First Rank, Second Class) and the office of Udaijin (Great Minister of the Right, i.e., inferior to the Minister of the Left)
 Tokugawa Hidetada had the rank of Jūichii and was Daijō Daijin (the Great Minister or Chancellor of the Realm)
 Tokugawa Iemitsu had the same rank and was Sadaijin (Great Minister of the Left, i.e., superior to the Minister of the Right)
 Tokugawa Ietsuna had the rank of Shōnii (Second Rank, First Class) and was Udaijin
 Tokugawa Tsunayoshi had the rank of Shōnii and was Udaijin
 Tokugawa Ienobu had the rank of Shōnii was Naidaijin (Great Minister of the Center, i.e., inferior to the Minister of the Left)
 Tokugawa Ietsugu had the rank of Shōnii was also Nadaijin 
 Tokugawa Yoshimune held the rank of Shōnii and was Udaijin
 Tokugawa Ieshige also held the rank of Shōnii and was Udaijin
 Tokugawa Ieharu also held the rank of Shōnii and was Udaijin 
 Tokugawa Ienari was Dainagon (Great Counselor)
 Tokugawa Ieyoshi
 Tokugawa Iesada 
 Tokugawa Iemochi
 Tokugawa Yoshinobu

Geo-political sub-divisions
The country was divided into provinces called , which were administered by governors  appointed by the Daijō-kan. The provinces were then further divided into districts called , under district governors  who were appointed by the local nobility. At the beginning of the eighth century, there were 592 districts making up 66 provinces.

See also
 Engishiki
 Imperial Household Agency
 Kōkyū
 Kuge
 Kugyō
 Sesshō and Kampaku
 Taihō Code
 Takahashi Ujibumi
 Twelve Level Cap and Rank System
 Yōrō Code

Notes

References

 Asai T. (1985). Nyokan Tūkai . Tokyo: Kōdansha.
 Dickenson, Walter G. (1869). Japan: Being a Sketch of the History, Government and Officers of the Empire. London: W. Blackwood and Sons. 
 Hall, John Whitney, Delmer M. Brown and Kozo Yamamura. (1993).  The Cambridge History of Japan. Cambridge: Cambridge University Press. 
 Ozaki, Yukio. (2001). The Autobiography of Ozaki Yukio: The Struggle for Constitutional Government in Japan. [Translated by Fujiko Hara]. Princeton: Princeton University Press.  (cloth)
 Ozaki, Yukio. (1955). Ozak Gakudō Zenshū . Tokyo: Kōronsha.
 Sansom, George (1958). A History of Japan to 1334. Stanford: Stanford University Press. 
 Sansom, George. (1952). Japan: A Short Cultural History. Stanford: Stanford University Press.   (cloth)  (paper) 
 Screech, Timon. (2006). Secret Memoirs of the Shoguns:  Isaac Titsingh and Japan, 1779-1822. London: RoutledgeCurzon. 
 Titsingh, Isaac. (1834). [Siyun-sai Rin-siyo/Hayashi Gahō, 1652], Nipon o daï itsi ran; ou, [https://books.google.com/books?id=18oNAAAAIAAJ&dq=nipon+o+dai+itsi+ran  Annales des empereurs du Japon.]  Paris: Oriental Translation Fund of Great Britain and Ireland.
 Ury, Marian.  (1999). "Chinese Learning and Intellectual Life," The Cambridge history of Japan: Heian Japan. Vol. II. Cambridge: Cambridge University Press.  (cloth)
 Varley, H. Paul , ed. (1980). [ Kitabatake Chikafusa, 1359], Jinnō Shōtōki ("A Chronicle of Gods and Sovereigns: Jinnō Shōtōki of Kitabatake Chikafusa" translated by H. Paul Varley). New York: Columbia University Press.

External links
National Archives of Japan – Drawings of the Dajokan Building (November, 1877)
 National Archives of Japan – Illustration of the new Dajokan Building (1877)
 National Archives of Japan –   Drawings for construction of the new building housing the ministries of Home Affairs and Finance (1874)
 National Archives of Japan –  Request concerning family registration statistics (1869)

Government of feudal Japan
Meiji Restoration
Classical Japan
Former government ministries of Japan